Jucimar Lima Pacheco (born 22 January 1989), commonly known as Abuda, is a Brazilian footballer who plays as a defensive midfielder for Camboriú.

Abuda made 43 competitive appearances for Vasco da Gama.

References

External links
Abuda at ZeroZero

1989 births
Living people
Sportspeople from Pará
Brazilian footballers
Brazilian expatriate footballers
Association football midfielders
Campeonato Brasileiro Série A players
Campeonato Brasileiro Série B players
Saudi First Division League players
Paysandu Sport Club players
Tuna Luso Brasileira players
Associação Ferroviária de Esportes players
Associação Atlética Francana players
Batatais Futebol Clube players
Esporte Clube Cruzeiro players
CR Vasco da Gama players
Associação Chapecoense de Futebol players
Associação Atlética Ponte Preta players
Atlético Clube Goianiense players
Figueirense FC players
Esporte Clube São Bento players
Associação Desportiva Cabofriense players
Al-Mujazzal Club players
Sampaio Corrêa Futebol Clube players
Luverdense Esporte Clube players
Camboriú Futebol Clube players
Süper Lig players
Gaziantepspor footballers
Brazilian expatriate sportspeople in Turkey
Brazilian expatriate sportspeople in Saudi Arabia
Expatriate footballers in Turkey
Expatriate footballers in Saudi Arabia